Lionnel Luca (born 19 December 1954 in Boulogne-Billancourt) is a French politician who was a member of the National Assembly for Alpes-Maritime's 6th constituency from 1997 to 2007. Since 2014, he is the Mayor of Villeneuve-Loubet. Luca is a member of the Union for a Popular Movement.

References

External links
 Official website
 Profile at the National Assembly

1954 births
Living people
People from Boulogne-Billancourt
French people of Romanian descent
Rally for the Republic politicians
Union for a Popular Movement politicians
The Republicans (France) politicians
Gaullism, a way forward for France
The Popular Right
Debout la France politicians
Tibet freedom activists
Deputies of the 11th National Assembly of the French Fifth Republic
Deputies of the 12th National Assembly of the French Fifth Republic
Deputies of the 13th National Assembly of the French Fifth Republic
Deputies of the 14th National Assembly of the French Fifth Republic
Mayors of places in Provence-Alpes-Côte d'Azur
Côte d'Azur University alumni